Nateby may refer to the following places in England:
 Nateby, Cumbria
 Nateby, Lancashire